Andréanne Morin (born August 9, 1981) is a Canadian rower and Olympian.

Career
Morin was an integral part of Canada's women's eights rowing team. She won medals at three world championships, a bronze medal at the 2003 World Rowing Championships and silver at the 2010 World Rowing Championships and 2011 World Rowing Championships. She was the NCAA champion in rowing 2006.

Morin was a three time Olympian finishing seventh in the 2004 Summer Olympics and in fourth place at the 2008 Summer Olympic Games in Beijing, China. At the 2012 Summer Olympics she was part the Canadian women's eight that won the silver medal.

Other work
Morin was a member of the Athlete Committee at the World Anti Doping Agency.

Education
She attended The Study, graduating in grade 11 in 1998, and later attended Phillips Exeter Academy, graduating in 2000, followed by a bachelor's degree in political science at Princeton University in 2006. She also later studied law at Université de Montréal.

Honours
In 2012 Morin was awarded the Queen Elizabeth II Diamond Jubilee Medal.

In 2019, an eponymous shell in her name, the A. Morin 2000, was christened and added to the Phillips Exeter Academy boathouse.

See also
Princeton University Olympians

References

External links
 
 
 
 
 

1981 births
French Quebecers
Living people
Olympic rowers of Canada
Sportspeople from Quebec City
Princeton Tigers women's rowers
Rowers at the 2004 Summer Olympics
Rowers at the 2008 Summer Olympics
Rowers at the 2012 Summer Olympics
Olympic silver medalists for Canada
Olympic medalists in rowing
Canadian female rowers
World Anti-Doping Agency members
Medalists at the 2012 Summer Olympics
World Rowing Championships medalists for Canada
Phillips Exeter Academy alumni
21st-century Canadian women